Carlton Hay (17 March 1875 – 15 April 1945) was a New Zealand cricketer. He played one first-class match for Auckland in 1893/94.

See also
 List of Auckland representative cricketers

References

External links
 

1875 births
1945 deaths
New Zealand cricketers
Auckland cricketers
Cricketers from Auckland